"Home Sweet" is a song recorded by American country music singer Russell Dickerson. It was released on January 11, 2021 as second single from his second studio album Southern Symphony. The song was co-written by Lady A's Charles Kelley, Casey Brown and Dickerson, who also produced by Dann Huff. A remix featuring Lady A themselves was released on November 19, 2021. The song peaked at number 11 on the Billboard Country Airplay chart, becoming Dickerson's first major-label single to miss number one.

Background
"Home Sweet" is inspired by Dickerson's wife, Kailey. They announced that they are expecting their first child in April 2021. In an interview, he said: “This song is as real as it gets. The week Kailey and I got home from our honeymoon my income stopped. I was in between deals and we were flat broke,” Dickerson explained about the new track. “Now we just moved into our new house and have a baby on the way so yeah, ‘Home Sweet’ is about as spot on real life as it gets.”

Music video
The music video was released on February 3, 2021, which the eight-year anniversary of the day Dickerson proposed to his now-wife Kailey. It shows Dickerson serenading Kailey with an acoustic song professing his love before getting down on one knee with a ring in hand, Kailey tearfully replying "yes" to the life-changing proposal, and goes on to characteristic clips from home-videos and self-shot footage from during the last eight years and their present-day marriage.

Charts

Weekly charts

Year-end charts

References

2021 singles
2020 songs
Russell Dickerson songs
Songs written by Russell Dickerson
Songs written by Charles Kelley
Song recordings produced by Dann Huff
Thirty Tigers singles